Elias (also known as La Mesa de Elias) is a small town located in the southern part of the Huila Department.

Municipalities of Huila Department